Andrew G. Maragos (born January 21, 1945) is an American politician. He was a member of the North Dakota House of Representatives from the 3rd District from 1993 to 2006 and again from 2011 to 2018. He is a member of the Republican party.

References

1945 births
Living people
Republican Party members of the North Dakota House of Representatives
People from Minot, North Dakota
21st-century American politicians